Henri Jöel Kouakou Tahiri (born March 17, 1986) is an Ivorian professional footballer who plays as a centre-back for Thai League 3 club North Bangkok University.

Club career

Buriram PEA
He played for them in a 2009 AFC Champions League match against Singapore Armed Forces FC.

References

External links
 

1986 births
Living people
Footballers from Abidjan
Ivorian footballers
Association football central defenders
Henri Joel
Henri Joel
Henri Joel
Henri Joel
Henri Joel
Henri Joel
Ivorian expatriate footballers
Ivorian expatriate sportspeople in Thailand
Expatriate footballers in Thailand